Reichenbach, also known as Reichenbach am Regen, is a municipality in the district of Cham in Bavaria in Germany. It lies on the river Regen, approximately 20 kilometers northeast of Regensburg. A charming village of approximately 1300 people, it is home to the Kloster Reichenbach, a former Benedictine monastery and baroque church dating back to the Middle Ages. Currently living within the renovated monastery are more than 400 people with physical and mental disabilities and about 500 staff. This makes it the most important employer in the region.

Geography
Reichenbach lies in the "Middle Bavarian Forest", in the middle Regental, in the valley of the river Regen. It borders on the following municipalities, from the north and clockwise: Walderbach, Wald and Nittenau (Schwandorf district).

Subdivisions
The municipality of Reichenbach consists of seven localities:
Heimhof
Hochgart
Kaltenbach
Kienleiten
Linden
Reichenbach
Windhof

History

To the 19th century
The settlement in the valley of the river Regen at a ford was the center of a grundherrschaftlich organized and managed district in the early Middle Ages. 1118 saw the founding of the monastery Reichenbach and since from then onwards  the history of the settlement and of the monastery became intertwined.

Reichenbach experienced an early bloom in the first decades of its existence. After the Wittelsbach 1204 over the Bailiwick had lost Reichenbach its regional importance. In the 14th century took a turn for the better. In the beginning of the 15th century, the monastery was largely re-built in Gothic style and surrounded by fortifications. These prevented the Hussiteneinfälle in 1428 and 1433.

In the 15th century, Reichenbach had the status of a market. It territorially belonged to the upper part of the Wittelsbach Kurpfalz, the residence of the city of Ahmadabad was administered.

Under the principle cuius regio, eius religio stood there after the 1555 Land Lord, the religion of his subjects to be determined. It was through Ottheinrich of 1556 to 1559 as Elector Palatine amtierte, the Lutheran Confession made mandatory. The monastery was repealed in 1556. In Reichenbach, it was John Hagnus, a graduate of the University of Wittenberg, the Protestant Church to enforce order. During the subsequent reign of Frederick III, Elector. (1559–1576), a supporter of the reformed, Calvinist direction of Protestantism, was Hagnus as other Lutheran clergyman dismissed. The Calvinist iconoclasts destroyed in 1570 by Reichenbacher monastery many artworks.

From 1626 was carried out by the new ruler, the Electorate of Bavaria, the re-Catholisation Reichenbach. 1661 electors under administration rose again in the Benedictine monastery, which from 1669 under the administration of St. Emmeram stood in Regensburg. Until 1695 the monastery was again an independent abbey and saw a second bloom.

Dissolution of the monastery
The lively scientific and literary activities of the Benedictine Reichenbacher ended in 1803 due to secularization, leading to the monastery's dissolution. The church has since undertaken a branch of the church parish forest Walderbach. The monastery was initially under state ownership, before 1820 the buildings were auctioned. The monastery buildings served different purposes, including Henry Waffle's pottery factory that he founded in 1841, which he operated until 1863.

Formation of a fire brigade
On 20 February 1882  the volunteer fire fighter department of Reichenbach was founded due to several fires in the city. Responsible citizens joined together and crafted firefighting equipment. The purchase of the first fire fighting machine on 9 July 1882 was a hand pump. 56 citizens were among the founding members. Its statutes were drawn up, whose first aim was on fire danger for the Protection of persons and their property in the first places Reichenbach, then also in the neighborhood service. The first "Commandant" was Alois Pestenhofer. At any time participated in the volunteer firefighters Reichenbach on all religious and municipal festivities and to the Gautagen in the county.

Merciful brothers
In 1890 the Merciful Brothers used the buildings to set up a healing and care institution for those mentally and physically handicapped.

Glance at the monastery Reichenbach Bite the monastery from the "Churbaierischen atlas" of Anton Wilhelm Ertl 16871893 began the monastery with the operation of its own brewery. At the start of Holy Week we went to the planned construction of the new and larger water pipe. This was almost two kilometers long. Many citizens of the community contributed to the complementary chauffeur. The sources were Windhof when.

Monastery Fire 1897
On the night of September 23, 1897 a fire broke in the convent buildings. The fire spread at breakneck speed and 140 Pfleglinge had to be evacuated. The water pipe was a big help, as the adjacent pond was already pumped dry after a short time. For eight days the fire raged and even after six weeks glowing debris still had to be pulled out. Although the fire claimed no lives, the monastery was a smoking ruin. The population of Reichenbach lent a huge hand in the reconstruction. Christmas 1897 was against the Straubing and after Attl relocated Pfleglinge again be brought back. Subsequently, was established in 1898 in a constant night Reichenbach employed.

The beginning of the 20th century

At the turn of 18th to the 19th century there was bitter poverty in the village. The population was rural, despite the structure, not enough food, enough fodder for the cattle. To each spot of grass on the roadside and around each piece of wood has been contentious. Many residents had no proper abode, nor adequate clothing, nor a steady income. Every man and child had to pull their weight to survive. During this time, and because many Reichenbacher cycled every day to [Wackersdorf] in the pit, to [Maxhütte] or even further to at least one to earn paltry wages. Others saw emigrating to America as their only hope of survival.

Development in the Pflegeanstalt at the beginning of the 20th century

1900 the pub closed in the monastery. A new water-supply was established in the monastery for wash-house and root gardens, since dry weather did not provide enough water as far back as 1893.

In 1908, under Father Eberhard Forstner from Kaisheim Reichenbacher, the funeral house was built.

At this time Reichenbach made great progress. Near the monastery he had Hopfengarten Creating whose income was totally insufficient to meet the needs of the monastery brewery.

Between Windhof and Wald (Oberpfalz) has created a granite quarry.  A blacksmith field was also erected.

Bahnstrecke Regensburg – Falkenstein   - The beginning of the county road CHA 25 

The new, widened road after Kienleiten Roßbach (now county road CHA 25), was the largest project of the Priors Eberhard Forstner. For the monastery, the planned rail link from Regensburg after Falkenstein tapped. (Construction began in July 1912 and early completion on 21 December 1913).
The road conditions in Reichenbach were very bad at that time. The driveway leading to the monastery from the north, from Kienleiten by the then main road, so on "Pfister" to the monastery. We opted for a new route across the western district. This road had the same width, like the also broadened "Kerchasteich" in the 60s [now: Kirchsteig] was uneven, curvaceous and could only be navigated by one at a time . If two times the carts really encountered one of the wagons had to go backwards, or was at certain points in the adjacent yards away. Nevertheless, there were unprecedented difficulties in the implementation. The residents wanted to or could not land on their competence. In order to widen the road and around a fairly straight and level course on a road to achieve leadership had vehemently in the ownership intervention. A house was demolished and behind another building half a floor up, because at the same height, the street level was raised. Some residents lost their farmyards, while others increased the property.

Prior to 1911 Fleischmann Frater Sympert the infrastructure in place continues to improve. His main focus was the continuation of the road to Roßbach forward. Now led by Reichenbach a wide street. Half of the village was channeled a stream of the New Road (this name was the road to modern times) cruised, was piping. For about 20 houses in Reichenbach was a water line was built. This aqueduct was until the introduction of the water district in 1967 in operation.

The users were only allowed to use boiled water only  because bacteria were always detected. Some residents said the source was also fed with "graveyard water". Since an epidemic especially concerned care institution, the decision was made to reorganize the water supply. This was the initial impetus for founding the circle Roding waterworks, supplied by the excellent Neubeuern sources."

The First World War and the postwar period
The First World War (1914–1918) also called for Reichenbach in his victims. The men of the village and 23 brothers in the military have been recovered, while 25 survived the war is not and 5 were missing. During the war, the food became very tight. Therefore, there were also food cards in Reichenbach. Even after the war gave this state a long time yet. In addition, there was inflation,  making the money worthless.

From 1919, an electrically operated Mahlmühle was put into operation, the 1943 official statement to be had. In 1920 the Reichenbach monastery shone in a favorable light. On the first Maisonntag had the electric light finally taken hold. The electricity was generated from steam.

1921 with regard to the prevailing housing shortage in the municipality of Reichenbach from 1 March each influx of foreign imports prohibited. In 1922, the water turbine at the nearby river rain improved. In 1923 the whole municipality introduced the electric light. The currency reform of 1923 brought a big improvement.

On the night of March 2, 1924, the monastery was hit by a devastating fire. The Holzlege and the barn burned down completely. All stocks of fodder, straw, and many cars and plows were lost. On March 5, the monastery bell rang, announcing another fire. This was a barn fire in Kienleiten. By tapferes could intervene on that day the house saved. On 7 March, two days later, there was a third fire alarm. Now burned beside the still-standing house down.

In 1924, a monastery built its own sawmill. During the completion phase of the hydroelectric plant at the rain, two floods during rainfall rolled an immense amount of water and approached the building, which threatened to collapse. Though these natural events delayed the construction, it was finally completed in 1926. They now made 20 hp.

1927, the council from 1 July, the survey of a beer tax, 1 per hectolitre Reichsmarks. With effect from 11 December 1927 was at the request of the monastery the tax on beer to 50 pfennig off.

The Second World War
From 1933-34 remained Reichenbach and the monastery from the terror regime of National Socialism is not spared, as were disabled were not liable, and so stayed here inhuman atrocities is not enough. Even now had men in the war. 31 are in the war fell and 6 were missing. Unlike the First World War in World War II was also the civilian population directly affected by the war and had often leave their homes and protection in Altels Felsenkeller chapel beside the mountain looking for.

As Nittenau was bombed, there were serious casualties among the people as well as Reichenbacher citizens. Because of the air attacks the windows had to be darkened from the inside. This was mandatory and strictly controlled. Foreign laborers from the occupied territories were occupied by the German Reich, and there were also farms used in Reichenbach. It was mainly in Poland and France.

1942 had paid customs bell again, only the smallest bell in the tower remained.

The end of the war and postwar period
Toward the end of the war was in the convent of the Brothers of Mercy a dam improvement store in which Hitler boys for the service at the front should be trained. Trott commander wanted the approaching American troops resistance and had set up tank traps. The response of Americans was clear: If even one shot fell, Reichenbach would be bombed. Then the population fled after Hochgart. Trott also fled, but was arrested shortly afterwards by the Americans in Falkenstein and shot.

When the Allied were advancing, the concentration camp of Flossenbürg was evacuated. On the death march, the prisoners also arrived in Reichenbach. Since it was night, some concentration camp prisoners took their last chance and dared to escape at the Häring brewery. Some were immediately shot dead, a few others hid in barns.

On April 24, 1945 American troops occupied the Reichenbach monastery. For the villagers, and especially for the children, who had still never seen a person with a different skin color, the colored soldiers piqued their curiosity. The occupation of Reichenbach by the Americans proceeded without major incidents.

Even the Reichenbach village housed many refugees. Just as in the First World War, during the war and afterwards only food to food cards. The villagers were able to partially support themselves, since almost all of them were farming.

1946 saw the re-establishment of the Economic Cross, and on 9 June, it was the wooden cross at the end of the eight missions of the Reichenbach Branch doomed. 1948 saw the currency reform. The village was founded in 1954 by a flood. The bridge was not passable during a rainy day.

Monastery Fire 1959
In 1959 a major fire broke again at the memory of the east wing of the monastery from Reichenbach. The major alarm called about 20 firefighters from the area to the scene, including the professional firefighters from Regensburg and a pioneering unit of the Armed Forces from arch was sent. The then District Sackmann immediately mobilized the relevant authorities and led all the safeguards for endangered art objects. The damage was considerable, standing at 172,700, - DM (To gauge the damage: The weekly earnings of a well-paid employee monastery in this period amounted to 35.00 DM / ca. 18 €).

The Reichenbacher bridge
Presumably, was already before the founding of the monastery Reichenbach 1118 a transition on the rain had been created, because it has also led a street of Cham over Reichenbach and Roßbach after Regensburg, Falkenstein and Straubing. The Reichenbacher bridge was mentioned for the first time in 1743 or 1744, when a flood damaged the bridge. 1750 cracks Eisstoß the wooden bridge away. Then the village and monastery had set dwellers with barges on the rain. In the wake of the secularization of 1803 the Bavarian builder of the bridge shaft of the community was over Reichenbach. The 1831 flood schwemmte the rain again built another bridge times continued. The creation of a new bridge was vital, since beyond the rain flow fields, and wood Hutweiden beaten and the proceeds anyway barely sufficient for survival. For the people who have horses with the bridge befuhren or for agricultural purposes had to use, there was the "bridge guilders" or "bridge duty." The bridge was always the biggest "problem child" of the community. The citizens always protested against the guilder to pay bridge and the councilors wanted the maintenance of the bridge to the county Roding pass. This was finally in 1924, probably in the course of expanding the feeder road (Districtstraße) for new railway errichtenten "Falkenstein - Regensburg." (From that time comes, the expansion of the existing main road - better known as "New Road" - current Pfister the road replacing Hauptstraße as. The formerly narrow path, similar to the Kirchsteig, has been under great protest of the riparian and with enormous effort, greatly widened.) Even the battle with the Bavarian State was terminated, so that these funds made available to a new wooden bridge to be built. After extinguishing the fire works at the monastery 1959 by the inadequate bearing capacity of the wooden bridge has been obstructed, another bridge was begun. Of the total cost of DM 810,000, the county only had 70,000 DM of its own resources to expend. The Reichenbach community had only 15,000 DM for the bridge ramp to afford. As the present bridge was completed, it was seen as the "most modern prestressed concrete bridge in the Upper Palatinate".

Territorial reform
The primary school in Reichenbach was dissolved at the beginning of the 1970/71 school year, since the students attend the community school in the Reichenbach Walderbach. By the end of the war, there were the municipalities Reichenbach, and Tiefenbach Treidling. The latter was disbanded in 1945. Reichenbach came to town the hamlet of Linden, Tiefenbach, Heimhof, Windhof, Treidling (name meaning: Treideln,-ing), while Middle Duke, wide-Prince and Gumpinger to the community forest. In 1972 the territory voted to reform the county town allotment to Cham, subject to that community to community forest management and forest Erbach with headquarters in Reichenbach could form. Should the community forest Erbach, the city Roding connect and the community forest remains independently, so the town wanted Reichenbach connection to the city and county Nittenau Schwandorf search. A Roding after incorporation was due to the distance of 15 km rejected. Through this reform area lost the town of Reichenbach 17.7% of its total area. The hamlet of Forestry, hunters height, Treidling and Holzseige (except Kaltenbach), and later even Tiefenbach, came to town Nittenau. Among the missing Gewerbesteuereinhamen, including the quarry in Treidling, the town still suffers today, because there was no compensation. The Reichenbach community remained independent, but formed an administrative branch along with the Walderbach community.

Steady development of the town
1975 finally made the construction of the drainage system (sewage). In 1976 the Johann-of-God-workshops were created. This is a workshop for Pfleglinge of the monastery, as well as external Pfleglinge.

In 1984 the era of "brewery Härig Reichenbach" came to an end. The brewery was founded in 1756. The last owners Anna and George Häring died in 1978.

In 1991, the kindergarten of St. Paul on the operation. Mid-July 1993 celebrated the town and the monastery "Kloster Reichenbach 875 years." Over the years, further construction expelled. 1998, the inauguration of the family chapel Reisinger Kienleiten in honor of St. Catherine instead.

In 1999, in the context of urban development of "Margrave-Dipold Square" (church) and the Eustachius-Kugler-road rehabilitated. On January 1, 2000 the new millennium was celebrated punctually at 12:00 o'clock with a huge fireworks display in the former convent garden. In 2001, the county road CHA 25 (main street) in Reichenbach up area was completely renovated and a sidewalk was built.

2002 flood
In August 2002 Reichenbach and all the other areas in the path rainwater flow were ravaged unprecedented flood. On the evening of August 12, the fire started in the youth campground spaces. On the night of 13 August, the disaster alert for the county Cham by the District Theo Zellner and the crisis in the county Cham exclaimed. It was already was clear at that time to everyone that this flood and exceeds all expectations of a new century will flood. The highest level of alarm has already been sounded at about 10 o'clock. At the same time as the floods began operation in Reichenbach. From 6 o'clock until 2 the next morning, the level was no longer measured due to the enormous amount of water. The UMS fell out. The lower riparian rain have been badly affected. In some streets the water was part of two meters above the road surface. The water level reached fortunately, a few centimeters of rain 22 bridge clock against its climax. Thus, the bridge will not be blocked.

A year later, the waterfront promenade was completely redesigned. 2005 qualifying competition at the municipality "Our village has a future" for the ruling circle. On a rainy day in 2006, the jury a picture of the place. Despite the bad weather was Reichenbach the silver medal.

Population development

Politics

Municipal council

The council consists of 12 members, including a woman.

CSU 6 seats FWR (Free Community voters Reichenbach) 6 seats

Mayor
The Mayor of Reichenbach is Eduard Hochmuth, elected in March 2020.

Coat of arms
The coat of arms of the place shows a "silver on a blue Wellenschildfuß out below red dragon."

The place Reichenbach, always in close relationship with the in the 12th century Benedictine monastery was founded, had since your 15th century, the status of a market whose own administration led seals. A still preserved in the early 17th century copied temple shows a seal coat of arms, the founder of the monastery Reichenbach attributed heraldic figure, depicting the dragon. The image of this traditional emblem recalled the close relationship between city and monastery Reichenbach. To document the situation of the community on rain water was considered a symbol of so-called Wellenschildfuß elected, making a historic and equally motivated heraldic emblem community has been obtained.

Arts and Culture

Religion
Reichenbach belongs to the parish forest Walderbach, at 1 September 2005 "Spiritual Unity Walderbach-Neubäu" has been extended. In the village are the Church of the Assumption Convent and other bands, such as The Queen of the Rosary Chapel House in the monastery of the Brothers of Mercy, which Painful Lady Chapel Hill (built in 1935 on the occasion of the 800th anniversary of the consecration of the monastery church), the Lady Chapel at Field Linden (built in 1950) and Katherine's Chapel in Kienleiten (Erected Fam by the Reisinger in 1998).

Church life and customs
Numerous are the testimonies of former folk piety, in woods and fields to find. At some of them are still prayers and Masses celebrated, for example at the Marienplatz or at the so-called "Pfaffenstein."

On 9 June 1949 was the so-called "cross-host" on a hill above the town doomed, which residents of Reichenbach, thanks to build, that the village in war threats spared. It bears the inscription "In this sign you will sing - for special thanks for protecting our village in danger of war" and was already established in 1946. Following the tradition there has been a cross 1914/1918 have confessed that during the period from 1939 to 1945 by fanatical groups was destroyed.

Since 1998, loads a crossroads, the Sonnhofweg along to this prayer site leads believers to linger in prayer. The Cross stations were in loving detail work of residents and employees of the monastery of the Brothers of Mercy artistically designed.

Marian devotion played in Reichenbach traditionally an important role. Persuade them, among other things Lourdesgrotte in the apse of the monastery church, which was inaugurated in 1895, and the mountain chapel in the street Pfister. The latter was built in 1935. The rock beside the chapel served the villagers during the Second World War as a protective bunker.

Since 1998, invites a chapel in Kienleiten the faithful to prayer. It was from the family Gerhard Reisinger after a promise is built and the St. Catherine doomed.

Not imagine from the church life were the Bittgänge, of community in which to weather and a good harvest was asked. On these occasions believers came from forest Erbach and Reichenbach to pray together. Reichenbach once attracted the forest after Erbach, another look at the forest after Erbacher Reichenbach, with them the faithful from praying Reichenbach went forward.

A highlight of the church year was certainly the Corpus Christi festival, in the vernacular "Prangertag referred. The path along which the procession went, it was with so-called "pillory Perennials" (birch), reed grass and fresh pine green with scarves and flags decorated. In addition, figurines and pictures of saints up to the house walls attached. Two statues of Our Lady, also per a figure of Joseph and Jesus were decorated with flowers and girls in the procession supported. For "Prangertag" belonged to it that the "landlord" or "Haering" to the traditional sausage meal went. Even if the sausages on the menu today are nothing more extraordinary, this usage has to this day.

Music
Reichenbach Church (since 1993) Reichenbacher monastery sparrows Employees choir of the monastery Reichenbach

Buildings
Monastery of the Brothers of Mercy 1118 Founded former Benedictine abbey Romanesque monastery church (interior in the style of the Baroque and Rococo redesigned) Lourdesgrotte in the apse of the monastery church

Natural Monuments
Marienplatz (Marie picture and a wooden cross in the forest, space for prayer and worship) Pfaffenstein (highest point in the up area, located in the forest, a wooden cross in the rock, space for prayer and worship) Teufelsbuchs'n (Teufelsbuz'n) (steep cliffs with a short Schliefröhre in Kienleiten; under BUZ is a creature of stunted growth)

Sport
Recreation center of the DJK Reichenbach

Regular events
Easter market in the monastery Reichenbach Maifeier on youth campground Johannifeier on youth campground Dorfkirta in the beer garden (Patron's Feast) Christkindlmarkt (Christmas market) in the monastery Reichenbach

Economy and infrastructure
The Monastery of the Merciful Reichenbach brothers live more than 400 people with physical and mental disability and are about 500 employees. This makes it the most important employers in the region. Furthermore, in Reichenbach with a supermarket butcher, several master carpentry businesses, a master car, a vehicle body and paint shops, a plant for interior and Akustikbau, an advertising technology agency and other small businesses located. There are numerous small and large farms in Reichenbach.

Transport
The municipality parts Reichenbach and Kienleiten are reinforced by a bridge connected. Die Gemeinde Reichenbach liegt relativ nahe zu überörtlichen Verkehrsstraßen. Durch den Ort selbst verläuft die Kreisstraße CHA 25 (Hauptstraße) und die CHA 27 (Bodensteiner Straße). Die Ortsteile Reichenbach und Kienleiten sind durch die Staatsstraße St. 2149 getrennt. Der Verkehr in diesem Kreuzungsbereich wird durch eine Ampel geregelt. Die Auffahrt zur neu gebauten B 16 (Roding-Regensburg) ist nur 3,5 km entfernt. Die Zufahrt zur B 85 (Schwandorf-Cham) ist ca. 15 km entfernt.

Media
Chamer newspaper (circulation: 10,215 total)
 The regional edition of the Straubinger Tagblattes / Landshuter Bayerwald Echo newspaper (circulation: 16,170 total)
 Edition of the regional Bavarian newspaper Mitteilungsblatt

Education
Kindergarten St. Paul Reichenbach eingruppiger is a full-day kindergarten and is due mainly to the needs of working parents aligned. It consists of 1 October 1991. Looked after the children from the third year of life from the municipality and employees of the institution of the Brothers of Mercy Reichenbach. The municipality has no Reichenbach own school (more). Only a professional college education, curative care is available in Reichenbach. This is the monastery of the Brothers of Mercy building. The students from Reichenbach Erbach go to the forest in the primary and secondary school. The nearest school is located in Nittenau (Regentalgymnasium). The nearest school is the State School in Roding.

Personalities

Sons and daughters of the village
 Andreas von Regensburg (born c. 1380 in Reichenbach on rain; died after 1442 in Regensburg)
 Benefiziat Augustin Wagner (1898–1945), a priest in Ebrantshausen at Main castle (brother before Frida Wagner, vulg. "Wagnerfrida" colonial goods Kirchsteig)

People who have worked on the spot
All persons listed here are in very close contact with the monastery Reichenbach
Markgrafentheater Diepold III. by Vohburg (born 10?; died 1146), monastery founder Pfalzgraf Otto I of Pfalz-Mosbach (1390–1461) Luth. Theologian, composer Johannes Hagius (1530–1596), 1556–1567 preacher and cantor in Reichenbach Anselm Meiller OSB, (born 15 February 1678 in Amberg, died 18 September 1761) Plank Domvikar Stetten George Dengler (1839–1896) Father Andrew Amrhein (born 4 February 1844 in Gunzwil, died 29 December 1927 in St. Ottilien) Frater Eustachius Kugler (born 15 January 1867 in Neuhaus in Nittenau; died 10 June 1946 in Regensburg) Kooperator Siegfried Hollmer (born 12 October 1930 in Konzell; died 19 April 1964), founder boys club Reichenbach (Burschenverein).

References

Cornelia Oelwein (Edit): The traditions of the monastery at Reichenbach rain, Publisher: Beck (Munich), 1991 Werner Endres: Reichenbacher Steingut, Publisher: City Museum Association and Nittenau Nittenau, 1991 Josef Klose, Rudolf Knopp, Wolfgang Kauzner, Günter Lorenz: 875 years on the rain Klosterreichenbach 1118-1993, publisher: community Reichenbach, Johann-of-God-Verlag (Munich), 1993 Maria Kagerer et al.: 100plus: Reichenbacher Retrospective 1890-2000, publisher: community Reichenbach, 1999 Heribert Batzl: Klosterreichenbach on rain, Publisher: Fast and Steiner (Regensburg), 2001 Josef Klose; Arved from Ropp: The former Benedictine abbey church Reichenbach, Publisher: Fast and Steiner (Regensburg), 2002 Maria Kagerer, Hermann Reisinger, Norbert Mezei: 125 years volunteer firefighters Reichenbach: Festschrift for the founding celebration of 27 to 30 July 2007, editors: Volunteer Fire Reichenbach, 2007

External links

 More about Reichenbach am Regen in German with more pages
       A Page about the fire brigade of Reichenbach am Regen

Cham (district)